Benthocodon is a genus of hydrozoans of the family Rhopalonematidae. The genus contains two known species: Benthocodon hyalinus and Benthocodon pedunculatus, however due to the small size and red pigmentation, they can easily be confused with related genera. Unlike many hydromedusae, these jellyfish do not have a sessile stage. Rather, they spend their entire lives in the water column as plankton. The genus Benthocodon can be found near the sea floor in the Pacific Ocean from Antarctica to California to the Arctic Ocean.

References 

Rhopalonematidae
Fauna of the Pacific Ocean
Monotypic cnidarian genera
Hydrozoan genera